St. James Street is a railway station on the Chingford branch of the Lea Valley lines, located in Walthamstow in the London Borough of Waltham Forest, east London. It has been operated by London Overground since 2015.

The station is in Travelcard Zone 3.

History
Located in Walthamstow, St. James Street station opens onto the street of the same name. This section of the A1006 route is the local high street. Shoppers have an easy route from the southernmost end of the market to the railway station, which provides a fast and regular route to the top of the market at Walthamstow Central or into central London at Liverpool Street.

After the transfer of the "West Anglian" portion of the former West Anglia Great Northern franchise to National Express East Anglia, the station was redeveloped. A dual staircase was constructed, allowing passengers to access the platform without passing through the main body of the station itself, and permitting the ticket office to be locked overnight. These have been closed off since the transfer to London Overground in 2015 to enforce a new ticket barrier inside the station which is staffed during all opening hours.

Services
Trains are operated by London Overground.

The typical off-peak weekday service pattern is:
4 trains per hour (tph) to London Liverpool Street;
4 tph to Chingford.

Connections
London Buses routes 158, 212, 230, 275, W11 and 675 serve the station.

References

External links

Railway stations in the London Borough of Waltham Forest
Former Great Eastern Railway stations
Railway stations in Great Britain opened in 1870
Railway stations served by London Overground
Walthamstow